October Moon is a 2005 independent horror film directed by Jason Paul Collum and starring Judith O'Dea, Brinke Stevens, Sean Michael Lambrecht, Jeff Dylan Graham, Tina Ona Paukstelis, Darcey Vanderhoef, and Jerod Howard. The plot concerns a male homosexual relationship that turns sour. After a limited theatrical run beginning September 29, 2005, the movie was distributed on DVD by Tempe Entertainment on Valentine's Day, February 14, 2006. The DVD release was an immediate success for the company, and remained their #1 Best Selling Title in 2006, 2008, 2009 and 2010. October Moon premiered on On Demand in March 2008. It was jointly produced by B+Boy Productions, LLC and Tempe Entertainment.

Cast
 Judith O'Dea as Mrs. Hamilton (Elliot's Mom)
 Brinke Stevens as Nancy
 Sean Michael Lambrecht as Corin Buckman
 Jeff Dylan Graham as Jake
 Jerod Howard as Elliot
 Tina Ona Paukstelis as Marti
 Darcey Vanderhoef as Maggie
 Michael Lecce as Johnny
 Chad J. Morrell as Sean / Chantal
 Joel Duffrin as Josie Lynn
 John Grzegorczyk as Detective / Man in Hat
 Ashley J. Anderson as Farmer Red
 Ariauna Albright as Operator (voice)
 James Hauser as Redneck #1
 Jeffrey Wayne Stevens as Jim in maintenance

Sequels
The sequel October Moon 2: November Son premiered in a limited theatrical run on July 10, 2008. The entire original cast returned, plus new cast members Debbie Rochon, Robyn Griggs and recording artist Sacha Sacket. The story followed a new mysterious young gay man (Sacket) who seems to bring danger into the lives of the surviving characters from the original film. October Moon 2 was released to DVD on April 14, 2009 by Ariztical Entertainment under the title November Son. Financial disputes between Ariztical and production company B+Boy Productions, LLC. returned the rights to B+Boy, who licensed the title to Tempe Entertainment for re-release on February 15, 2011 under its original title October Moon 2: November Son with original artwork by Paul Girard.

A third film in the trilogy was planned, but as of 2019 had still not been officially announced.

References

External links
 
 

2005 films
2005 horror films
American independent films
American LGBT-related films
LGBT-related horror films
2005 LGBT-related films
2000s English-language films
2000s American films